Aya Domenig (born 1972) is a film-maker and anthropologist of Japanese–Swiss origin.

Early life and education 
Born in Kameoka, Kyoto, Kyoto Prefecture, Japan, Aya Domenig has joint Swiss and Japanese citizenship. Her mother is of Japanese origin, Domenig's father is Swiss, and her grandfather, Shigeru Doi, worked at the Hiroshima Red Cross Hospital after the atomic bombing of Hiroshima on 6 August 1945.

In 1976 Domenig's parents moved to Switzerland, where they lived in Kilchberg and in Zürich-Hottingen. She attended a gymnasium in Zürich, and from 1992 to 2000 she studied social anthropology, film studies, and japanology at the University of Zurich. Earning a Monbushô scholarship by the Government of Japan, Domenig attended the Hitotsubashi University in Tokyo from 1996 to 1997. Domenig's practical experiences include language stays in France and Japan at the Sendagaya Japanese Institute, she was in two internships, and also worked as translator. Domenig graduated with a degree in visual anthropology in 2000.  In 2001 Domenig attended the film and video department at the ZHdK University Zürich where she graduated in 2005, after producing the short fiction film Haru Ichiban (Spring Storm) in co-operation with the Osaka University of Arts and Visual Media (Osaka Geijutsu Daigaku).

Work 
Aya Domenig published a social study treating the relevance of the Swiss novel Heidi in 2001, and in 2007 she participated a study related to the funeral culture on behalf of the government of the city of Zürich.

Aya Domenig's first documentary film was Oyakata - The Master, her graduation work in 1999, which was presented in 2000 and 2001 at film festivals in Austria, Germany, Switzerland, in the UK and USA. Her 2015 documentary film Als die Sonne vom Himmel fiel was supported by the Swiss film subsidy (Filmstiftung) of the Canton of Zürich for research and production, and produced by ican films gmbh and Schweizer Radio und Fernsehen (SRF). Since I was a teenager, I always wanted to know more about the background of my grandfather. Aya Domenig tells in her first feature film the fate of her grandfather who worked as doctor after the atomic bombing of Hiroshima on 6 August 1945 in a Red Cross hospital in Hiroshima. While researching her film in the Hiroshima Prefecture, on 11 March 2011 the Fukushima Daiichi nuclear disaster occurred, and Domenig decided to expand her project. The documentary film premiered at the Festival del film Locarno on 9 August 2015.

Filmography (selected works)

Festivals 
Oyakata:
 2000: Internationales ethnografisches Filmfestival IWF, Göttingen, Germany. 
 2000: 7th International Festival of Ethnographic Film, London, England.
 2001: 36th Solothurner Filmtage, Solothurn, Switzerland.
 2001: University of Texas, Festival of Ethnographic Film, Texas, USA.
Je t’aime:
 2002: Schweizerisches Film- und Videofestival Spiez, Spiez, Switzerland.
 2002: Vevey Images `02, Vevey, Switzerland.
 2002: Festival der Nationen, Ebensee, Austria.
Haru Ichiban:
 2005:  Locarno International Film Festival, Locarno, Switzerland. 
 2005: 'Internationale Kurzfilmtage, Winterthur, Switzerland.
 2006: Solothurner Filmtage, Solothurn, Switzerland.
 2006: Stuttgarter Filmwinter, Stuttgart, Germany.
 2006: FIPA Biarritz, Biarritz, France.
 2006: Premier Plans, Festival d’Angers, France.
 2006: International Short Film Festival, Clermont-Ferrand, France.
 2006: Worldwide Student Film Festival, Potsdam-Babelsberg, Germany.
 2006: Festival du Film Court de Lille, France.
 2006: Poitiers International Film Schools Festival, Poitiers, France.
 2006: Mediawave International Film and Music Gathering, Hungary.
Als die Sonne vom Himmel fiel:
 List of related festivals

Awards 
 2000: JVC Student Video Prize for Oyakata.
 2002: Goldener Drachen („bemerkenswerter Spielfilm") for Je t’aime.
 2006: Prix Cinécinéma (Premier Plans, Festival d’Angers) for Haru Ichiban.
 2016: Swiss Film Award nomination Best Documentary Film and Best Film Score for Als die Sonne vom Himmel fiel.
 2016: Swiss Film Award for Best Film Score (Beste Musik) for Marcel Vaid.
 2016: Tokyo, Green Image Film Festival, Green Image Award for Als die Sonne vom Himmel fiel.
 2016: Schwerin, Filmkunstfest Mecklenburg-Vorpommern, Special Mention for Als die Sonne vom Himmel fiel.
 2016: Paris, Festival International Jean Rouch, Prix Mario Ruspoli for Als die Sonne vom Himmel fiel.
 2016: Paris, Festival International Jean Rouch, Prix Anthropologie et Développement Durable for Als die Sonne vom Himmel fiel.
 2016: Gilching, Fünf Seen Filmfestival, Horizonte Filmpreis for Als die Sonne vom Himmel fiel.
 2016: Bozen, Bozner Filmtage, Lobende Erwähnung for Als die Sonne vom Himmel fiel.
 2016: Bozcaada, Bozcaada International Festival of Ecological Documentary, Fethi Kayaalp Grand Prize - 2nd Prize for Als die Sonne vom Himmel fiel.

Publications 
 Aya Domenig: "'Cute Heidi'. Zur Rezeption von Heidi in Japan." In: Heidi. Karrieren einer Figur (p. 149-165). Offizin, Zürich 2001, .

Literature 
 Ins Landesinnere und darüber hinaus. Perspektiven des Schweizer Dokumentarfilms – 14 Porträts. Published by Schweizer Feuilletondienst (SFD). Limmat Verlag, Zürich 2014, .

References

External links 
 
 International website of The Day the Sun Fell

Swiss film directors
1972 births
Living people
University of Zurich alumni
Japanese film directors
Japanese women film directors
Japanese people of Swiss descent
Zurich University of the Arts alumni
Swiss anthropologists
Swiss women anthropologists
Swiss writers in German
Swiss science writers
Swiss women film directors
Women documentary filmmakers
21st-century Swiss women artists
21st-century Swiss women writers
Swiss documentary filmmakers
21st-century Swiss scientists
21st-century women scientists